The 2022 OFC Women's Nations Cup was an international football tournament held in Fiji from 13 to 30 July 2022. The nine national teams involved in the tournament were required to register a squad of up to 26 players, including two goalkeepers. Only players in these squads are eligible to take part in the tournament.

The position listed for each player is per the official squad list published by the OFC. The age listed for each player is on 13 July 2022, the first day of the tournament. The numbers of caps and goals listed for each player do not include any matches played after the start of tournament. The nationality for each club reflects the national association (not the league) to which the club is affiliated. A flag is included for coaches that are of a different nationality than their own national team.

Group A

Cook Islands
The squad was announced on 6 July 2022.

 Coach:  Gary Phillips

Samoa
The squad was announced on 9 July 2022.

 Coach:  Paul Ifill

Tonga
The squad was announced on 9 July 2022.

 Coach:  Connie Selby

Group B

Papua New Guinea
The squad was announced on 6 July 2022.

 Coach:  Nicola Demaine

Tahiti
The squad was announced on 1 July 2022.

 Coach: Stéphanie Spielmann

Vanuatu
The squad was announced on 9 July 2022.

 Coach: Jean Robert Yelou

Group C

Fiji
The squad was announced on 8 July 2022.

 Coach:  Lisa Cole

New Caledonia
The squad was announced on 20 June 2022.

 Coach:  Michel Berbeche

Solomon Islands
The squad was announced on 1 July 2022.

 Coach: Batram Suri

Player representation

By age

Outfield players
Oldest:  Claudean Robati
Youngest:  Hinavainui Malfatti

Goalkeepers
Oldest:  Tupou Brogan
Youngest:  Kimberly Uini

Captains
Oldest:  Gwendoline Fournier
Youngest:  Elma Aiviji

By club nationality

References

Squads
2022